The Yamaha YZF-R7 or OW-02 is a race homologation motorcycle made by Yamaha in limited production run of only 500 units. It was designed to compete in the Superbike World Championship and Suzuka 8 Hours endurance races.

But Yamaha also produced two race kits for the R7 the first that made  when the other, unused bank of fuel injectors is activated and a pipe and ECU update.

The R7 was built for racing 'out of the box', implied by the chassis, which was derived from information and geometry from the YZR500 machines of the period.

Super Streetbikes magazine ranked the R7  eighth in its list, "The 10 Most Exotic Bikes Ever", due to its extraordinary price, "top-spec Öhlins race suspension and running gear", and that the bike, "looked utterly amazing: genuine two-wheeled sex", but said it was ironic that in spite of being the "most exotic R-series bike ever", it "actually turned out to be a bit of a lemon". The problem was that the bike as sold was hobbled, at only 100 hp, and that small teams could not afford the "thousands of dollars" of racing upgrades necessary to make the R7 competitive, and when they did, "the crankshafts failed". For the sake of simplicity and cost savings, Yamaha had chosen to detune the engines for bikes imported into all countries to meet the German market's maximum horsepower regulation, partially because whatever level it was detuned to was irrelevant, given that virtually every buyer intended to modify the bike from street-legal form in order to race.

When the R7 was announced in 1999, only 50 were slated to be imported to the US, ten of which were earmarked for Yamaha's factory team. The waiting list for the remaining bikes far exceeded supply. The difficulty in obtaining one prompted Cycle Worlds Don Canet to caution eager buyers, "Hey, whoah 'er down there, Mr. Trump. Having the cash is not always enough."

In 2001, motorcycling journalist Roland Brown had a high-side crash riding the YZF-R7 of World Superbike racer Noriyuki Haga during testing at Circuito de Jerez, Spain. Cycle World, in a 2016 retrospective, had retired racer Freddie Spencer ride the R7 alongside five other famous racing bikes from the years 1986 through 2013. After riding earlier years' bikes and then moving to the R7, Spencer said, "We've just moved into the modern age. This is the first bike that needs a steering damper." Compared to the other racing motorcycles, the R7 looked "a bit pedestrian", with its stripes and markings being only stickers instead of painted on, and having "a subtlety to it that makes it blend into the crowd."

Notes

YZF-R7
Sport bikes
Motorcycles introduced in 1999